Pietro Paltronieri, also referred to as il Mirandolese (1673–1741) was an Italian painter of the late Baroque period, known for his capricci and active mainly in Rome, Bologna, and Vienna.

Biography
He was a pupil of Giovanni Francesco Cassana and Marcantonio Chiarini. In quadratura, he collaborated with Ercole Graziani the Younger. He was known as Il Mirandolese dalle Prospettive to distinguish him from his contemporary fellow countryman, Giuseppe Perracini. Both had studied together with Giovanni Francesco Cassana in Modena, prior to moving to Bologna.

Gallery

References

Bibliography

1673 births
1741 deaths
People from Mirandola
17th-century Italian painters
Italian male painters
18th-century Italian painters
Painters from Bologna
Italian Baroque painters
Quadratura painters
18th-century Italian male artists